Edward M. Schneider (September 17, 1881 – March 25, 1946) was a Republican member of the Wisconsin State Assembly.

Biography
Schneider was born on September 17, 1881 in Oshkosh, Wisconsin. He worked as a stenographer on the railroad, and as a bank director. He was an officer in a milling company. He served on the Winnebago County, Wisconsin Board of Supervisors from 1911 to 1914. Schneider was elected to the Assembly in 1944 and served until his death. He died on March 25, 1946.

References

Politicians from Oshkosh, Wisconsin
Businesspeople from Wisconsin
County supervisors in Wisconsin
Republican Party members of the Wisconsin State Assembly
American people of German descent
1881 births
1946 deaths
20th-century American politicians
20th-century American businesspeople